Drug of Choice is a novel written by Michael Crichton, as his eighth published novel, and the sixth to feature his pseudonym John Lange. It was originally published in 1970. Hard Case Crime republished the novel under Crichton's name in November 2013.

Proposed film adaptation
Film rights were optioned in 1970 by the actor Robert Forster and his agent David de Silva, to produce a film starring Forster called High Synch. John Neufeld was hired to write a screenplay. "Unlike the book, our script will not have a happy ending", said Forster. "We think the movie ought to serve as a warning." However, the film was never made.

References

Novels by Michael Crichton
1970 American novels
Works published under a pseudonym
Novels about drugs
Debut science fiction novels
1970 debut novels
Signet Books books